Broken may refer to:

Literature 
 Broken (Armstrong novel), a 2006 novel by Kelley Armstrong in the Women of the Otherworld series
 Broken (Slaughter novel), a 2010 novel by Karin Slaughter

Music

Albums 
 Broken (And Other Rogue States), a 2005 album by Luke Doucet
 Broken (MBLAQ EP) (2014)
 Broken (Nine Inch Nails EP), (1992)
 Broken (Soulsavers album) (2009)
 Broken (Straight Faced album) (1996)

Songs 
 "Broken" (Jake Bugg song) (2013)
 "Broken" (Sam Clark song) (2009)
 "Broken" (Coldplay song) (2019)
 "Broken" (Elisa song) (2003)
 "Broken" (Lifehouse song) (2008)
 "Broken" (lovelytheband  song) (2017)
 "Broken" (Kate Ryan song) (2011)
 "Broken" (Seether song) (2004)
 "Broken" (Slander and Kompany song) (2019)
 "Broken", by 12 Stones from 12 Stones
 "Broken", by All That Remains from Victim of the New Disease
 "Broken", by David Archuleta from Begin
 "Broken", by Bad Religion from The Process of Belief
 "Broken", by Bullet for My Valentine from Venom
 "Broken", by Tracy Chapman from Let It Rain
 "Broken", by Daley
 "Broken", by Bruce Dickinson from The Best of Bruce Dickinson
 "Broken", by Depeche Mode from Delta Machine
 "Broken", by Robert Downey Jr. from The Futurist
 "Broken", by Everclear from Welcome to the Drama Club
 "Broken", by Gorillaz from Plastic Beach
 "Broken", by The Guess Who from "Albert Flasher"
 "Broken", by Lindsey Haun from the film Broken Bridges
 "Broken", by Jack Johnson from Sing-A-Longs and Lullabies, Soundtrack for the Film Curious George
 "Broken", by Late of the Pier from Fantasy Black Channel
 "Broken", by Leona Lewis from Echo
 "Broken", by Madonna, recorded for Celebration but released separately
 "Broken", by McLean
 "Broken", by Nate Haller from Party in the Back
 "Broken", by Tift Merritt from Another Country
"Broken", by Kim Petras from Clarity
 "Broken", by Kelly Rowland from Ms. Kelly, later re-issues
 "Broken", by Sentenced from Crimson
 "Broken", by Sonata Arctica from Winterheart's Guild
 "Broken", by Stream of Passion from Darker Days
 "Broken", by Tears for Fears from Songs from the Big Chair
 "Broken", by UNKLE featuring Gavin Clark from War Stories

Film
 Broken (1993 film), an American long-form music video
 Broken (2005 film)
 Broken (2006 film), an American drama film by Alan White
Broken, a 2006 film broadcast by Horror Channel
 Broken (2012 film), a British coming-of-age drama film by Rufus Norris
 Broken (2013 film), a Nigerian drama film by Bright Wonder Obasi
 Broken (2014 film), a South Korean revenge thriller film by Lee Jung-ho

Television
 Broken (American TV program), a 2019 American investigative documentary television program
 Broken (British TV series), a 2017 British television drama series
 "Broken" (CSI: Miami), an episode of CSI: Miami
 "Broken" (House), an episode of House
 "Broken" (Once Upon a Time), an episode of Once Upon a Time

See also 
 Broken Bow (disambiguation)
 Broken English (disambiguation)
 Broken Heart (disambiguation)
 Broken River (disambiguation)
 Broken Wings (disambiguation)
 The Broken (disambiguation)